Geitlandsjökull is a lateral glacier of Langjökull, the second largest ice cap in Iceland (953 km2),  in the west of Iceland. The highest point of Geitlandsjökull, which lies on top of a tuya, reaches a height of 1,400 m.

References

Tuyas of Iceland
Western Region (Iceland)
Borgarbyggð
Glaciers of Iceland
West Volcanic Zone of Iceland